

See also
King George's Fields

References

King George V
Fields
Parks and open spaces in London
London
King George V Playing Fields